Daniel James Barden (born 2 January 2001) is a Welsh professional footballer who plays as a goalkeeper for Championship club Norwich City.

Club career
Barden signed for Norwich City from Arsenal in January 2019.

He spent the 2019–20 season on loan at Bury Town, making 26 appearances in all competitions.

In March 2020 he signed a new contract with Norwich.

On 5 September 2020, Barden made his first senior appearance for Norwich City in their EFL Cup first round tie against Luton Town. Norwich lost the game 3–1. He made his Football League debut on 29 December 2020 when he replaced the injured Michael McGovern at half-time during Norwich's 1–1 draw with Queens Park Rangers.

He moved on loan to Scottish Premiership club Livingston in July 2021.

He was diagnosed with testicular cancer in October 2021, and said that he would be taking a break from football. On 26 December 2021 he gave an interview with Norwich City's matchday programme where he said the treatment had gone well and he thanked the fans, the club and his family for their support.

On 13 December 2022, Barden signed for National League club Maidstone United on loan.

International career
Barden has played for Wales at under-19 level. In March 2021 he was called up by the Wales under-21 squad for the first time, for the friendly match against Republic of Ireland later that month.

Career statistics

References

2001 births
Living people
Welsh footballers
Wales youth international footballers
Wales under-21 international footballers
Association football goalkeepers
Arsenal F.C. players
Norwich City F.C. players
Bury Town F.C. players
Livingston F.C. players
Maidstone United F.C. players
Isthmian League players
English Football League players
National League (English football) players